Elections to the European Parliament were held in Belgium on 13 June 1999. The Dutch electoral college elected 14 MEPs, the French electoral college elected 10 MEPs and the German-speaking electoral college elected 1 MEP. The European elections were held on the same day as the federal election and the regional elections.

Results

Belgium
European Parliament elections in Belgium
1999 elections in Belgium